Calum Jose von Moger (born 9 June 1990) is an Australian actor and bodybuilder. He is best known for his portrayal of Arnold Schwarzenegger in the 2018 film Bigger.

Bodybuilding career 
 1st - NABBA Junior International Championships, 2011, Melbourne 
 3rd - NABBA Junior Southern Hemisphere Championships, 2011, Gold Coast, Australia
 1st - WFF Junior Mr Universe, 2011, Baden, Austria 
 1st - NABBA Class 1 International Championships in May 2013 in Melbourne 
 3rd - NABBA Class 1 Southern Hemisphere Championships in May 2013 in Gold Coast, Australia
 5th - WFF Universe – Superbody, 2013, Thessaloniki
 1st - WFF Mr Universe, 2014, Seoul, South Korea (WFF Pro Card) 
 1st - WFF Mr Universe, 2015, La Ciotat, France 
1st - WFF Pro European Championships, 2015, Tuscany, Italy
1st - Venice Muscle Beach Contest, Novice, 2016, Venice Beach, California 
 1st - NPC Irongames Championships, Classic Physique, 2016, Culver City, California 
 1st - NPC Classic Physique  Universe, 2020, Charleston, South Carolina (IFBB Pro Card)

Personal life

Calum was born on 19th July 1990 in Victoria, Australia and grew up on a farm in Geelong. His family are from Austrian and Dutch decent. He started training at a young age with his older brother and his friend at a local gym which they used to sneak into after hours. After training for a few years, he started his competitive career in NABBA. In his first year he won the amateur Mr Universe and decided to take up bodybuilding full time. Calum has won the Mr Universe title four times. 

In October 2014, he moved to Los Angeles where he started working  at GNC (store). Calum began dating model and fitness influencer Karina Elle. Calum was signed by Muscular Development Magazine in 2014, he quickly gained the nickname Arnold 2.0 when fans started to compare his physique to Arnold. He was sponsored by supplement company Cellucor from 2014-2016 and served as the face of the brand attending expos and events. Calum is a huge animal lover, he has had several pets in the past including a goldfish named Coleslaw, a dog named Rex and a lizard named Baz. 

Calum attained several life threatening injuries in a space of 6 months, in November 2017 he tore his biceps while barbell curling 140kg in Gold’s Gym Venice with Classic Physique Bodybuilder Chris Bumstead. In April 2018, Calum tore his quad while rock climbing and was found to have blood clots after this injury which resulted in getting surgery done. 

Calum has a son named Kyros (born 2020) who lives with the mother Nicola Segura in Los Angeles, California. They had a legal battle over the custody of their child, which was later settled between the two. 

In 2020, Calum returned to competing and won his IFBB Pro card after winning the NPC Universe in Classic Physique.

Calum had a supplement company called Stauch, which closed down in 2021. In October 2021, he moved back to Australia where he opened a gym that soon closed.

On 6 May 2022, Calum autodefenestrated and sustained injuries requiring ICU treatment after jumping out an apartment window.

On 26th May 2022 Calum pleaded guilty to possession of testosterone, cannabis, methamphetamine, and ice. Calum received a $500 fine from the Magistrate and attended rehab. 

In July 2022, Calum's younger brother attacked an elderly couple with a boomerang while high on methamphetamine, damaging their car.

On 2023 he moved back to Los Angeles, California where he made a comeback to social media and getting back on track with fitness, along with sponsorships from a clothing and supplement brand.

Acting career

 Generation Iron 2 as himself (2017)
 Bigger as Arnold Schwarzenegger (2018)
 Calum Von Moger: Unbroken as himself (2019)

References

External links 
 
 Yelena Deyneko (interview), Torkil Gudnason (photography) Calum von Moger Australian-born Mr. Universe, has his mind set on a higher purpose. in: Spirit and flesh, 20 November 2015
 Stephen Brook Calum von Moger: muscle missionary in: The Australian,  27 March 2015.
 Calum Von Moger – Arnold 2.0 | Bio, Stats, Training, Diet and Injuries

1990 births
Living people
Australian bodybuilders
Australian people of Austrian descent
Australian people of Dutch descent
Male actors from Geelong
People from Victoria (Australia)